Bernardo Prudencio Berro (April 28, 1803 – February 19, 1868) was the President of Uruguay from 1860 to 1864.

Background

Berro was a member of the National (Blanco) Party. He served as the President of the Senate of Uruguay in 1852, and from 1858 to 1859.

President of Uruguay (first, provisional term)

Berro first served as head of state of Uruguay in a provisional government for several weeks in 1852, during a brief period in which the National Party came to power.

President of Uruguay (second term)

He led the National Party's return to power in 1860 and made attempts to unite the country's political factions, efforts not seldom opposed by members of his own Party and Government.

Assassination

Berro and former president Venancio Flores were both assassinated on February 19, 1868.

See also
 History of Uruguay
 Paraguayan War

References

External links
 Uruguay Country Study, click on "Caudillos and political instability" for information on Berro

Presidents of Uruguay
Presidents of the Senate of Uruguay
Uruguayan people of Spanish descent
1803 births
1868 deaths
Assassinated Uruguayan politicians
Assassinated heads of state
People murdered in Uruguay
Assassinated heads of government
Place of birth missing
National Party (Uruguay) politicians
19th-century Uruguayan people
1868 murders in South America
19th-century murders in Uruguay